The Amami language or languages, also known as Amami Ōshima or simply Ōshima ('Big Island'), is a Ryukyuan language spoken in the Amami Islands south of Kyūshū. The southern variety of Setouchi township may be a distinct language more closely related to Okinawan than it is to northern Ōshima.

Speakers
The number of competent native speakers is not known, but native speakers are found mostly among old people—as a result of Japan's language policy which suppresses proliferation of minority languages, the younger generations speak mostly Japanese as their first language. Estimates run around 10,000 for the northern variety and 2,000 for the southern (Setouchi) variety.

Classification
Linguists mostly agree on the validity of the Amami–Okinawan languages as a family. The subdivisions of Amami–Okinawan, however, remain a matter of scholarly debate, with two major hypotheses:
In a two-branch hypothesis, posited by Nakasone (1961), Hirayama (1964) and Nakamoto (1990), among others, Amami–Okinawan divides into Amami and Okinawan, with the northern and southern varieties of Amami Ōshima both falling within the Amami branch. 
In a three-subdivision hypothesis, proposed by Uemura (1972) as one of several possible classifications and supported by Karimata (2000), Northern Amami Ōshima (perhaps together with Kikai) and Central/Southern Okinawa form two branches, while the intervening varieties – Southern Amami Ōshima (Setouchi), Kunigami, and the dialects/languages of the islands between – form a third branch. In this proposal, Amami Ōshima does not constitute a single language, and the northern and southern varieties are not even more closely related to each other than they are to other Ryukyuan languages.

The two-subdivision hypothesis is convenient for discussing the modern languages since the posited linguistic boundary corresponds to the centuries-old administrative boundary that today separates Kagoshima and Okinawa Prefectures. In addition, several isoglosses do group Northern and Southern Amami together. This can rarely be observed in Okinawan dialects.

The three-subdivision hypothesis is more phylogenetically-oriented. A marked isogloss is the vowel systems.

The vowel system-based classification is not without complication. The northern three communities of Kikai Island share the seven-vowel system with Amami Ōshima and Tokunoshima to the south, while the rest of Kikai falls in with Okinoerabu and Yoron even further south.
Based on other evidence, however, Karimata (2000) and Lawrence (2011)  tentatively group Kikai dialects together.

Dialects
Amami Ōshima can be divided into Northern Amami Ōshima and Southern Amami Ōshima despite conflicting patterns of isoglosses.
The distribution of Southern Amami Ōshima roughly corresponds to Setouchi Town, including offshore islands. The rest of the main island speaks Northern Amami Ōshima.

Shibata et al. (1984) takes a lexicostatistic approach to subgrouping Northern Amami Ōshima dialects:
East China Sea side
Akatana
Yamato Village
Uken Village
Pacific Ocean side
Komi (Kominato)
Northern Sumiyō
Southern Sumiyō
In addition, Sani, a small community on a peninsula at the northern tip of the island, is known to have distinct phonology.

Based on phonetic and lexical evidence, Shibata et al. (1984) subdivide Southern Amami Ōshima into
Higashi (Eastern) Magiri
Nishi (Western) Magiri
reflecting the administrative divisions during the Edo period. While Uke Island belonged to the Nishi Magiri district, its dialect is closer to that of Higashi Magiri.

Southern Amami Ōshima contrasts with Northern Amami Ōshima in its final unreleased consonants.

Names
According to Osada Suma (1902–1998), the dialect of Yamatohama, Yamato Village of Amami Ōshima had   for 'language',    for 'island language' (i.e. Standard Japanese). Another term, shimaguchi , is absent from Osada's dictionary. According to Kurai Norio (b. 1923), a local historian from Amami Ōshima, shimaguchi contrasted with Yamatoguchi, while shimayumuta was associated with accentual and intonational differences among various shima (villages). Ebara Yoshimori (1905–1988), a folklorist from Naze, Amami Ōshima, conjectured that shimaguchi was of relatively recent origin, possibly made through analogy with Yamatoguchi.

Phonology

Consonants
Historically, vowel-initial words acquired an epenthetic glottal stop. When *wo and *we later became  and  without an initial glottal stop, the glottal stop elsewhere became phonemic. When still later initial consonants were elided, an initial glottal stop merged with the following consonant, establishing a series of "glottalized" consonants. While the nasals are truly glottalized, the "glottalized" stops are merely tenuis , contrasting with the default aspirated stops .

Closed syllables
In the southern Shodon dialect, the consonants  occur at the end of a word or syllable, as in  'neck',  'cherry blossom' and  'well'. 
Other dialects are similar. Final consonants are usually the result of eliding high front vowels. Elision is partly conditioned by pitch accent.

Vowels 
There are seven distinct vowel qualities in Amami Ōshima, in addition to a phonemic distinction between long and short vowels and in some dialects oral and nasal vowels.

 derives from *e and merges with  after alveolar consonants.  mostly derives from a merger of *ae and *ai, and so is usually long. In several northern dialects, the nasal vowels  developed from the loss of a word-medial :
 *pama >  'shore', *jome >  'bride', *kimo >  'liver', *ɕima >  'island', *mimidzu >  'earthworm'

Kasarisani dialect has 11 oral and nasal vowels, while Sani dialect adds long vowels for a total of 18, the largest inventory of any Ryukyuan dialect.

Resources
 Amami hōgen bunrui jiten (1977–1980) by Osada Suma, Suyama Nahoko and Fujii Misako. A dictionary for the dialect of Osada's home community, Yamatohama, Yamato Village of Amami Ōshima (part of Northern Amami Ōshima). Its phonemic romanization was designed by Hattori Shirō. He also supervised the early compilation process. This dictionary is partially available online as the Amami Dialect Dictionary .
The Phonetics and Vocabulary of the Sani Dialect (Amami Oshima Island, Ryukyuan language group)''' (2003) by Karimata Shigehisa. Sani is known as a language island.
 Kikaijima hōgen-shū (1977 [1941]) by Iwakura Ichirō. A dictionary for the author's home community, Aden, and a couple of other southern communities on Kikai Island of the Amami Islands (its membership disputed).
Samuel E. Martin, 1970. Shodon: A Dialect of the Northern RyukyusShigehisa Karimata, 1995–1996. The Phonemes of the Shodon dialect in Amami-OshimaReferences

Further reading
Samuel E. Martin, 1970. Shodon: A Dialect of the Northern RyukyusYuto Niinaga, 2009. How Do We Describe Demonstratives in Yuwan Ryukyuan?In Japanese
Shigehisa Karimata, 1995–1996. The Phonemes of the Shodon dialect in Amami-OshimaMasao Ono, 2003. Phonological characteristics of Northern Amami dialectsNobuko Kibe, 2011. Phonological characteristics of Kikaijima''

Link 

Research Report on the Kikaijima Dialects published by the National Institute for Japanese Language and Linguistics (in Japanese)

Kagoshima Prefecture
Ryukyuan languages